Garazi Fácila Giralte (born 25 October 1999) is a Spanish footballer who plays as a defender for Alavés.

Club career
Fácila started her career at AF Calahorra.

References

External links
Profile at La Liga

1999 births
Living people
Women's association football defenders
Spanish women's footballers
Deportivo Alavés Gloriosas players
Primera División (women) players
Segunda Federación (women) players
Footballers from Navarre
People from Ribera del Alto Ebro
CA Osasuna Femenino players